Arthur Hughes may refer to:

Arts and entertainment
Arthur Hughes (American actor) (1894–1982), American actor on the stage, radio and films
Arthur Hughes (British actor) (born 1992), British actor on stage, radio and television
Arthur Hughes (artist) (1832–1915), English painter and illustrator
Arthur Foord Hughes (1856–1934), English artist
Arthur Wellesley Hughes (1870–1950), Canadian musician and composer
Frank Randle (1901–1957), English comedian, born as Arthur Hughes

Sports
Art Hughes (American soccer) (born 1965), American soccer player
Art Hughes (Canadian soccer) (1930–2019), Canadian soccer player
Arthur Hughes (English footballer) (1883–1962), English footballer for Bolton Wanderers, Southampton and Manchester City 
Arthur Hughes (rugby union) (1924–2005), New Zealand rugby union player
Arthur Hughes (Scottish footballer) (1927–2015), Scottish footballer for Grimsby Town and Gillingham
Arthur Hughes (Welsh footballer) (1884–1970), Chirk F.C. and Wales international footballer

Others
Arthur Hughes (politician) (1885–1968), Australian politician
Arthur William Hughes (1883–1964), British businessman in Hong Kong
Arthur Hughes (archbishop) (1902–1949), British prelate of the Catholic Church 
Arthur Hayden Hughes (born 1939), United States Ambassador to Yemen, 1991–1994

See also
Hughes (surname)